Roman folklore is the folklore of ancient Rome, including genres such as myth (Roman mythology), legend, joke, charms, fable, ghostlore, and numerous others. Scholars have published a variety of collections focused on the folklore of ancient Rome. Roman folklore is closely related to Ancient Greek folklore and precedes Italian folklore.

Notes

References

Anderson, Graham. 2006. Greek and Roman Folklore: A Handbook. Greenwood press
Busk, Rachel Hariette. 1877. Roman Legends: A Collection of the Fables and Folk-lore of Rome. Estes and Lauriat.
Halliday, William Reginald. 1927. Greek and Roman Folklore. G. C. Harrap.
Hansen, William. 2019. The Book of Greek and Roman Folktales, Legends, and Myths. Princeton University Press. 

folklore
Folklore by country